Auguste Mathieu Panseron (26 April 1796 – 29 July 1859) was a French composer and voice teacher.

Life
Born in Paris, Panseron studied in Vienna with Antonio Salieri, having been accepted by the master thanks to a recommendation by Luigi Cherubini. In 1824, Panseron began teaching singing at the Conservatoire de Paris. Early in his career, he wrote four works for the Opéra-Comique in Paris: La Grille du parc (1820),  Les Deux cousines (1821), Le Mariage difficile (1823), and L'École de Rome (1829). Other works for the stage followed. However, he achieved wider recognition as a composer by producing more than 200 popular and patriotic songs, including romances, barcarolles, and chansonettes, and by his large number of religious works in all forms, including seven masses.

Panseron gained a lasting reputation with his pedagogical works, many of which continue to be published and used today. These include his Méthode complète de vocalisation, in editions for all categories of voice; solfège exercises in editions for solo voice, vocal ensembles, piano, and violin; vocalises; and other specialized exercises.

He died in Paris aged 65.

External links
Musica et memoria : Prix de Rome - 1813, Auguste Panseron (1795-1859) (in French)
 Musical Manuscripts Collection at the Harry Ransom Center

1796 births
1859 deaths
19th-century classical composers
19th-century French composers
19th-century French male musicians
French male classical composers
French music educators
French opera composers
French Romantic composers
Male opera composers
Musicians from Paris
Prix de Rome for composition